Ligoniel is a north-western suburb of Belfast, on the upper Crumlin Road.  As its name suggests, it was originally a village located in a limestone hollow of Wolf Hill which is where supposedly the last wolf in Ireland was killed.

References

Districts of Belfast